Dibblee is a surname. Notable people by that name include:

 George Binney Dibblee (1868-1952), newspaperman and academic who was manager of the Manchester Guardian.
 Thomas Dibblee (1911-2004), American geologist.
 Benjamin Dibblee (1876–1945), American football player and coach.
 Allan Dibblee (1856–1915), hardware merchant and political figure in New Brunswick, Canada.
 Frederick Dibblee (1753–1826), Canadian Church of England clergyman.